The 2001 Women's Hockey Intercontinental Cup was the sixth edition of the women's field hockey tournament. The event was held from 17–30 September, across two host cities, Abbeville and Amiens in France.

England won the tournament for the first time after defeating Russia 4–0 in the final. Ukraine finished in third place, defeating Japan 4–3 in penalties following a 1–1 draw.

The tournament served as a qualifier for the 2002 FIH World Cup in Perth, with the top six teams qualifying automatically. The seventh placed team qualified to the three–match playoff series held in Cannock, which was to be played against the United States.

Qualification
All five confederations received quotas for teams to participate allocated by the International Hockey Federation based upon the FIH World Rankings. Those teams participated at their respective continental championships but could not qualify through it, and they received the chance to qualify through this tournament based on the final ranking at each competition.

 – Kenya withdrew from participating.
 – United States withdrew from participating.

Squads
Below is the list of participating squads.

(1.) Daphné Heskin, (2.) Anne-Sophie De Scheemaeker, (3.) Charlotte De Vos, (4.) Isabelle Wagemans, (5.) Maïté Dequinze, (6.) Magali Demeyere, (7.) Olivia Bouche, (8.) Caroline Guisset, (9.) Sophie Turine, (10.) Valérie Van Elderen, (11.) An Christiaens, (12.) Tiffany Thys, (13.) Caroline Cuylits, (14.) Céline Robiette, (15.) Barbara Dequinze, (16.) Elke Mertens, (17.) Anne-Sophie Van Regemortel, and (18.) Miek Vandevenne.

(3.) Lisa Faust, (4.) Amy MacFarlane, (5.) Deb Cuthbert, (6.) Jenny Johnson, (7.) Sue Tingley, (8.) Aoibhinn Grimes, (9.) Julia Wong, (10.) Kristen Taunton, (11.) Karen MacNeill, (12.) Carla Somerville, (13.) Laurelee Kopeck, (15.) Michelle Bowyer, (16.) Becky Price, (19.) Andrea Rushton, (20.) Kelly Rezansoff, (22.) Emily Rix, (23.) Amy Agulay (gk), (30.) Krista Thompson (gk). Head Coach: Graeme "Butch" Worth.

(1.) Anna Bennett, (2.) Jenie Bimson, (3.) Sarah Blanks, (5.) Melanie Clewlow (captain), (6.) Tina Cullen, (7.) Helen Grant, (9.) Leisa King, (10.) Denise Marston-Smith, (11.) Purdy Miller, (12.) Mandy Nicholson, (13.) Carolyn Reid (gk), (16.) Hilary Rose (gk), (17.) Jane Smith, (18.) Rachel Walker, (19.) Kate Walsh, (21.) Lucilla Wright, (24.) Kerry Moore, (26.) Frances Houslop, and (27.) Isabel Palmer. Head Coach: Tricia Heberle.

Tingoleima Chanu (gk and captain), Helen Mary (gk), Amandeep Kaur, Suman Bala, Kanti Baa, Sita Gossain, Sumari Tete, Agnecia Lugun, Masira Surin, Neha Singh, Manjinder Kaur, Jyoti Sunita Kullu, Saggai Ibemal Chanu, Suraj Lata Devi, Pakpi Devi, Adline Kerketta, Mamta Kharab and Surinder Kaur. Head Coach: Ajay Kumar Bansal.

(1.) Tara Browne (gk), (2.) Angela Platt (gk), (3.) Arlene Boyles, (4.) Jenny Burke, (5.) Linda Caulfield, (6.) Eimear Cregan, (7.) Karen Humphreys, (8.) Rachael Kohler, (9.) Laura Lee, (10.) Pamela Magill, (11.) Jenny McDonough, (12.) Cathy McKean, (13.) Claire McMahon, (14.) Lynsey McVicker, (15.) Ciara O'Brien, (16.) Jill Orbinson, (17.) Sarah Rand, and (18.) Daphne Sixsmith. Head Coach: Riet Kuper.

(1.) Nami Miyazaki (gk), (2.) Keiko Miura, (3.) Asuka Chiba, (5.) Sachimi Iwao, (6.) Natsumi Hori, (7.) Yuka Ogura, (8.) Sakae Morimoto, (9.) Akemi Kato, (10.) Naoko Saito, (11.) Toshi Tsukui, (12.) Rie Terazono, (13.) Chie Kimura, (14.) Kaori Chiba, (16.) Yukari Yamamoto, (17.) Yukiko Suzuki, (19.) Emiko Yokota, (21.) Yuko Morishita, and (22.) Akiko Kitada. Head Coach: Kazunori Kobayashi.

(1.) Nadezhda Sumkina (gk), (3.) Galyma Karabalinova, (4.) Olga Kikeleva, (5.) Oxana Berkalieva, (6.) Ekaterina Zhukalina, (7.) Elena Svirskaya, (8.) Ainura Mutallyapova, (9.) Elena Apelganetz, (10.) Elena Lind, (11.) Gulnara Imangalieva, (12.) Tatyana Marchenko (captain), (13.) Olga Apelganetz, (14.) Olga Shelomanova, (15.) Natalya Podshivalova, (16.) Marya Tussubzhanova (gk), and (18.) Natalya Dryamova.

(1.) Lim Siew Gek, (2.) Catherine Lumbor, (3.) Norhaliza Abdul Rahman, (4.) Norfaraha Hashim, (6.) Rosmimi Jamalani, (7.) Lisa Ludong, (8.) Daring Nyokin, (9.) Devaleela Devadasan, (10.) Mary Along, (11.) Che Inan Melati Che Ibrahim, (12.) Hamidah Birang, (13.) Munaziah Mulim, (14.) Norsaliza Ahmad Soobni, (15.) Norliza Sahli, (16.) Ernawati Mahmood, (18.) Angela Kais, (20.) Ayu Afnida Hamdani, and (21.) Vimala Subramaniam.

(1.) Victoria Kotlyarenko (gk), (2.) Fyeridye Bilyalova, (3.) Aishe Ramazanova, (4.) Olena Fritche, (5.) Iryna Knyazeva, (6.) Diana Tahiyeva, (7.) Marina Dudko, (8.) Tetyana Kobzenko (captain), (9.) Svitlana Kolomiets, (10.) Olena Mykhalchenko, (11.) Natalya Vasyukova, (12.) Zhanna Savenko, (13.) Maryna Litvinchuk, (14.) Tetyana Salenko, (15.) Svitlana Petrenko, (16.) Olga Fisyun, (17.) Maryna Pyrohova, and (18.) Lyudmyla Vyhanyaylo. Head Coach: Zhuk Tetyana.

(1.) Andrea Fazzio (gk), (2.) Eugenia Chiara, (3.) Bettiana Ceretta, (4.) Agustina Carbone, (5.) Florencia Castagnola (captain), (6.) Patricia Bueno, (7.) Maria Ines Raiz, (8.) Rosario de los Santos, (9.) Ana Hernández, (10.) Patricia Carluccio, (11.) Virginia Silva, (12.) Rosanna Paselle (gk), (13.) Adriana Boullosa, (14.) Carla Margni, (15.) Virginia Casabo, (16.) Laura Pradines, (17.) Veronica Tutte, and (18.) Eleonora Rebollo. Head Coach: Jorge Norvay.

Results
All times are Central European Summer Time (UTC+02:00)

Preliminary round

Pool A

Pool B

Classification round

Thirteenth and fourteenth place

Ninth to twelfth place classification

Crossover

Eleventh and twelfth place

Ninth and tenth place

Fifth to eighth place classification

Crossover

Seventh and eighth place

Fifth and sixth place

First to fourth place classification

Semi-finals

Third and fourth place

Final

Awards

Final standings

Goalscorers

References

External links
Official website

Women's Intercontinental Cup
International women's field hockey competitions hosted by France
Q
Intercontinental Cup
Sport in Amiens
Abbeville
Intercontinental Cup